The L.I. Roe House is located in Stanley, Wisconsin.

History
The house was originally built in 1892 and expanded in 1906. Norwegian immigrant Roe was a clerk in the Northwestern Lumber Company's store, president of the school board, first president of the Citizen's State Bank, and ran a wood products factory.

It was listed on the National Register of Historic Places in 1980 and on the State Register of Historic Places in 1989.

References

Houses on the National Register of Historic Places in Wisconsin
National Register of Historic Places in Chippewa County, Wisconsin
Houses in Chippewa County, Wisconsin
Colonial Revival architecture in Wisconsin
Houses completed in 1892